The tribe Loteae is a subdivision of the plant family Fabaceae, in the Robinioids. These genera are recognized by the USDA:

 Acmispon Raf. 1832
 Anthyllis L. 1753
 Antopetitia A.Rich. 1840

 Coronilla L. 1753
 Cytisopsis Jaub. & Spach 1844
 Dorycnium Mill. 1754 – included in Lotus
 Dorycnopsis Boiss. 1839

 Hammatolobium Fenzl 1842

 Hippocrepis L. 1753—horseshoe vetches
 Hosackia Douglas ex Lindl. 1829
 Hymenocarpos Savi
 Kebirita Kramina & D.D.Sokoloff 2001

 Lotus L. 1753—bird's-foot trefoils
 Ornithopus L. 1753
 Ottleya D.D.Sokoloff 1999

 Podolotus Royle 1835
 Pseudolotus Rech.f. 1958
 Scorpiurus L. 1753—scorpion's tails
 Securigera DC. 1805—crown vetches
 Syrmatium Vogel 1836
 Tetragonolobus Scop. 1772
 Tripodion Medik. 1787
 Vermifrux J.B.Gillett 1966

Notes

References

External links

 
Fabaceae tribes